In fairy tales, a fairy godmother is a fairy with magical powers who acts as a mentor or parent to someone, in the role that an actual godparent was expected to play in many societies. In Perrault's Cinderella, he concludes the tale with the moral that no personal advantages will suffice without proper connections.

The fairy godmother is a special case of the donor.

In fairy tale and legend
Actual fairy godmothers are rare in fairy tales, but became familiar figures because of the popularity of the literary fairy tales of Madame d'Aulnoy and other précieuses, and Charles Perrault. Many other supernatural patrons feature in fairy tales; these include various kinds of animals and the spirit of a dead mother.  The fairy godmother has her roots in the figures of the Fates; this is especially clear in Sleeping Beauty, where they decree her fate, and are associated with spinning.

In the tales of précieuses and later successors, the fairy godmother acts in a manner atypical of fairies in actual folklore belief; they are preoccupied with the character and fortunes of their human protegees, whereas fairies in folklore had their own interests.

Typically, the fairy godmother's protégé is a prince or princess, who is the hero of the story, and the godparent uses her magic to help or otherwise support them. The most well-known example is probably the fairy godmother in Charles Perrault's Cinderella. Eight fairy godmothers appear in Sleeping Beauty in Charles Perrault's version and in the Grimm Brothers' version titled Little Briar Rose the thirteen so-called godmothers are called Wise Women. The popularity of these versions of these tales led to this being widely regarded as a common fairy-tale motif, although they are less common in other tales.

Indeed, the fairy godmothers were added to The Sleeping Beauty by Perrault; no such figures appeared in his source, "Sole, Luna, e Talia" by Giambattista Basile. A great variety of other figures may also take this place. She is portrayed as kind, gentle and loving.

Précieuses
In the works of the précieuses, French literary fairy tales, fairy godmothers act much as actual godmothers did among their social circles, exerting their benefits for their godchildren, but expecting respect in return.

Madame d'Aulnoy created a fairy godmother for the evil stepsister in her fairy tale The Blue Bird; in this position, the fairy godmother's attempts to bring about the marriage of her goddaughter and the hero are evil attempts to impede his marriage with the heroine.  Likewise, in her The White Doe, the fairy godmother helps the evil princess get revenge on the heroine.  In Finette Cendron, the fairy godmother is the heroine's, but after helping her in the early portion of the tale, she is offended when Finette Cendron does not take her advice, and Finette must work through the second part with little assistance from her.

In Henriette-Julie de Murat's Bearskin, the heroine has a fairy godmother, but she is offended that the heroine's marriage was arranged without consulting her, and refuses to assist.

In fiction

Fairy godmothers appear frequently in fairytale fantasy, especially comic versions and retellings of Cinderella and Sleeping Beauty.  Mercedes Lackey presents a gently lampooned version of the concept in her Tales of the Five Hundred Kingdoms series, in which Fairy Godmothers are magically-gifted women who monitor magical forces across the kingdoms. Whenever events are right for a fairy tale to recur, the relevant Fairy Godmother steps in to make sure that the tale in question runs its course with as few fatalities as possible.

 In William Makepeace Thackeray's The Rose and the Ring, the fairy Blackstick concludes that her gifts have not done her godchildren good; in particular, she has given two of her goddaughters the title ring and the title rose, which have the power to make whoever owns them beautiful, which have ruined the character of those goddaughters; with the next prince and princess, she gives them "a little misfortune", which proves the best gift, as their difficulties form their characters.
 In C. S. Lewis's The Magician's Nephew, when Uncle Andrew explains how he made the magical rings from dust left to him by his godmother, he points out that she may have had fairy blood, and so he might have been the last man to have a fairy godmother.
 In the television animated Halloween special Witch's Night Out, the witch is mistaken for a "fairy godmother" by the two children, Small and Tender. Their sitter, Bazooey corrects them by addressing the fairy godmother as a "wicked witch".
 The Fairly OddParents is a humorous animated TV series where the fairies Cosmo and Wanda are (rather incompetent) godparents.
 In Shrek 2, the Fairy Godmother (voiced by Jennifer Saunders) who appears is an evil twin sister of Cinderella's fairy godmother. She is a conniving, crooked businesswoman (with a personality rather like that of the Stepmother in Cinderella), who is quite willing to resort to blackmail and/or murder to further her own interests. The pure reason for helping princesses gain a happily ever after with Prince Charming is the fact that Prince Charming is actually the Fairy Godmother's son, and through the marriage he will gain the throne. She also said to Shrek that she strongly believe that ogres don’t live happily ever after.
 In the Discworld novel Witches Abroad, fairy godmothers are a type of witch. The main antagonist is a plotting fairy godmother, Lady Lilith de Tempscire (Lily, the sister of witch Granny Weatherwax), who uses the power of stories and mirror magic to control the city of Genua. Magrat Garlick becomes fairy godmother to Ella Saturday (the rightful ruler of Genua) following the death of Desiderata Hollow, but throws away the magic wand at the end (as she was unable to use it for any purpose other than turning objects into pumpkins).
 In The Dresden Files novels (primarily Grave Peril and Summer Knight), the main character, a modern wizard named Harry Dresden is revealed to have a faerie godmother by the name of Leanansidhe who enjoys ensnaring Harry in one-sided deals.
 Once Upon a Midnight features the character of Angelica, the Blue Fairy, an overzealous fairy godmother.
 Fairy Godmother plays a leading role in web series Wish It Inc. She is portrayed by Portal voice actress Ellen McLain.
 The first King's Quest game features a fairy godmother of the main character Graham who can grant him invincibility.
 The otome game My Candy Love features a fairy godmother who will appear randomly and give the player gifts.  She is a bit of an odd case in that she is implied to be an eccentric aunt who merely dresses as a fairy godmother.
 In the TV series True Blood, Season 4, Episode 1, the character Sookie learns of her fairy heritage, including that she has a godmother who is actually a blood relative on her fairy side.
 In the film Maleficent, Princess Aurora, the Sleeping Beauty, mistakenly assumes Maleficent to be this, as the latter had been watching out for her since she was little, though the Princess Aurora doesn't know about her curse, or the person who cast it.
 In the fourth season of superhero series Legends of Tomorrow, the team hunts magical creatures across time that have escaped from Mallus' realm. One of the creatures is Tabitha (portrayed by Jane Carr), the fairy godmother of a girl in 1692 Salem, Massachusetts. She is later revealed to be a lover of Neron and later tricks Nora Darkh into becoming the new fairy godmother. Tabitha helps Neron in his plan to open a portal to hell and attacks the Legends with a dragon called Wickstable, which originally hatched in young Zari Tomaz's possession, at Heyworld. When young Zari regains control of Wickstable, the dragon eats Tabitha before regressing back to a baby dragon.

See also

 Black Annis 
 Crone
 Fairy
 Godparent
 Hag
 Pixie
 Queen (Snow White)
 Sea witch
 Wicked fairy godmother
 Witchcraft
 The Witch (fairy tale)

References

Fairy tale stock characters
Fictional fairies and sprites
Fictional characters who use magic
Female characters in animation
Female characters in fairy tales
Female characters in film
Cinderella characters